Roberto Cabrejas Cuadrado (28 December 1952 – 4 July 2001) was a Spanish athlete who specialised in the high jump. He won a silver medal at the 1983 Ibero-American Championships. In addition, he represented his country at the 1980 Summer Olympics and 1983 World Championships.

His personal bests in the event were 2.26 metres outdoors (Madrid 1983) and 2.22 metres indoors (Milan 1982).

International competitions

References

RFEA bio

1952 births
2001 deaths
Spanish male high jumpers
Sportspeople from the Province of Burgos
World Athletics Championships athletes for Spain
Athletes (track and field) at the 1980 Summer Olympics
Olympic athletes of Spain
Sportspeople from Gipuzkoa
People from Andoain
Athletes (track and field) at the 1983 Mediterranean Games
Mediterranean Games competitors for Spain
20th-century Spanish people
21st-century Spanish people